Commerce Bank may refer to:

Banks

United States
 Commerce Bancshares, a bank based in Missouri, with branches in numerous Midwestern states
Commerce Bank, a subsidiary of Commerce Bancshares
Commerce Bank & Trust Company, Worcester, Massachusetts
 Commerce Bank Harrisburg, an independent franchise of Commerce Bancorp in Harrisburg, Pennsylvania, U.S.
 Commerce Bank & Trust of Topeka, former name of CoreFirst Bank & Trust, Topeka, Kansas
 Commerce National Bank, Columbus, Ohio
 Global Commerce Bank, Doraville, Georgia
 Texas Commerce Bank, acquired by Chemical Banking Corporation of New York in 1987
 Virginia Commerce Bank, acquired by United Bank of West Virginia in 2014

Other places
 Bangladesh Commerce Bank Limited, in Dhaka, Bangladesh
 Housing and Commerce Bank, a bank in Asmara, Eritrea

Other uses
 Commerce Bank Arts Centre, former name of Investors Bank Performing Arts Center, Washington Township, New Jersey, U.S.

Sports
 Commerce Bank Championship, a golf tournament on the Champions Tour
 Commerce Bank Park, former name of FNB Field
 Commerce Bank Park (New Jersey), former name of TD Bank Ballpark

See also
 Commerzbank, a bank based in Frankfurt, Germany
 Commerce Bancorp, a defunct bank based in Cherry Hill, New Jersey, U.S.